WYKS (Kiss 105.3) is a commercial radio stations operating in Gainesville, Florida, broadcasting to the Gainesville-Ocala, Florida area on 105.3 FM. The station's format is Contemporary Hit Radio and Top 40 music, and the station has broadcast with this format and call sign since 1981.

History
The station began broadcasting in 1970 on 105.5 FM as WGVL, beginning as a country station but soon switching to album oriented rock. As an AOR station, WGVL was one of the most popular radio stations in Gainesville during the 1970s, often beating AM Top 40 stations WRUF and WGGG in its target male demographics.

After WRUF-FM abruptly switched from beautiful music to AOR as "Rock 104" in 1981, WGVL's management decided to take a new tack. On Christmas Day 1981, WYKS "Kiss 105" was born with a CHR format, signing on with Bob and Doug McKenzie's version of "The Twelve Days of Christmas." Kiss 105.3 has remained one of the most popular radio stations in the market since. The frequency changed from 105.5 to 105.3 in 1995, and although the station's effective radiated power remained at 3,000 watts, there was a slight increase in tower height, which improved the station's coverage area.

Notable Personalities
Douglas J. Gillen - President/Owner
Karl Kaufmann - Original Program Director and morning show host 1981 - 1985 (PD for WGVL '79-'81) Returned as Sales Manager 1992-96
Jeri Banta - Program Director/Morning Show Host - 1984 - 2003
Kevin Quinn - program Director/Operations Manager/ Morning Show Host - 2003 - 2010 
Rebecca Kutchko- Business Manager - 2007 - 2018 
Mark Page - Sales Manager
Christian Chase - Sales Manager
Joshua Drake - Account Executive
Matt Frey - House Account Manager/On Air Personality
Rondre Adams - Air Personality (Middays)/Production Director
Nick Vance - Air Personality (Afternoons)/ Assistant Program Director
Tom Collins - Air Personality (Nights)
Brett Douglas - Air Personality (Morning Show) (Current)
Ryan Dupree - Air Personality (Middays) and Production Director
JP Kruze (Mo' Bounce) - Air Personality (Nights)
Casey Layne - Air Personality (Morning Show)
Deena Hart - Air Personality (Morning Show)
Tyler Whitney - Air Personality (Morning Show)
Greg West - Air Personality
Todd Steele - Air Personality
Johnny Walker - Air Personality
Dave Fox - Air Personality
Shea Michaels - Air Personality
Mark "Hi-there" Andrews - Air Personality
Harold Minch - Air personality (arrived to WYKS from WRUF-FM)
Jobe Wise - Air Personality
Lou Patrick - Management & Air Personality (1984)
Julie Spencer - Air Personality.
Bob Micheals - Morning Show Air Personality
Steve Russell - Sports / News, and "Rock Reflections"
Jeri Banta - Mornings/ Program Director
Harsha Ramayya - Afternoon Drive 
Jeff Phillips - Overnights/7-Midnight/Creator and Host of 'All Request Saturday Night' 
Tom Collett - Overnights & Account Executive 
Brandon O'Brien -APD/MD Afternoons
Brooke Taylor - Air Personality
Chris Adams - Air Personality (Afternoons)
Hollywood John Harlow - APD/Afternoons 
Jennifer Page - Nights 
Dean Kenzie - Mornings 
Corey Foley - Mornings 
Jeff Bachmeier - Mornings 
Taylor Mayz - Middays 
Andrew Garick (Chris Lewis) - Air Personality 
Mike Masters (Michael Ramirez) - Air Personality 1991-1994 (Creator and original host of "The Perimeter" show)
Steven Chadwick - Resident DJ "The Perimeter" / Air Personality 1999-2004 
Joey G (Joey Greene) - Resident DJ and co-host of "The After Party" / Air Personality (Saturday Nights)  
Casey Kasem/Ryan Seacrest - Weekends (American Top 40) 1987–Present

Frank "McVie" - Air Personality, weekends (afternoon and evenings) 1987-1989

The Perimeter
"From The Outside Looking In" - The Perimeter on Kiss 105.3 is a Gainesville, Florida ritual, bringing the best of the Underground to the airwaves and the internet each and every Sunday night at 8pm EST. A veritable overnight success, The Perimeter was created in 1992 by Mike Masters, the PM Drive on-air personality at the time, and has remained the top rated weekend radio broadcast in the region since then.  Masters crafted the name of the show after the famed I-285 "Perimeter" in Atlanta, GA - upon return from a weekend visit to his brother who lived there.

The Perimeter initially included music from the Progressive and Industrial genres, along with the Drum & Bass, House, Breakbeats and Hip Hop that you can still hear.  The show is an anomaly, finding its home on Gainesville's biggest Pop/Top 40 station, however - it is a testament to the staying power of cutting edge Electronica in all of its forms. With perennial favorites Dave Fox (The Voice) at the helm, and resident deejay Comic assuming the role of logistics after the departures of TCX and Steven Chadwick, the show is on course to increase its audience in the upcoming months.

With an alumni list that reads like the 'Who's Who' of the Southeast EDM scene, and new up-and-comers crawling out of the woodwork almost daily, the show is never at a loss for quality talent and mind-altering music! As of June 2007, guest DJ's are  DJ Mo, Flaco, Ghost, Stylist, Fawda Bass, and many others.

External links
Official Website

WGVL/WYKS-FM history 
The Perimeter on Kiss 105.3

YKS
Contemporary hit radio stations in the United States
Radio stations established in 1970
1970 establishments in Florida